Gulganj Fort is an eighteenth century fort in the Chhatarpur district in Madhya Pradesh. Located at the top of a hill, It is built in the Bundeli architecture style. It was used as a residence and at a same time, also used as a defensive structure. Under British Raj, the fort was used as a local administrative headquarters. The fort is a typical garhi - that is defined in local language as a small fort at top of hill near a source of water hidden in forest or trees and away from the main paths. It is believed that the fort was built by King Sawant Singh for his mistress Gulbai.

References 

Forts in Madhya Pradesh